Copenhagen Municipality, also known in English as the Municipality of Copenhagen, located in the Capital Region of Denmark, is the largest of the four municipalities that constitute the City of Copenhagen, the other three being Dragør, Frederiksberg, and Tårnby. The Municipality of Copenhagen constitutes the historical city centre and the majority of its landmarks. Copenhagen Municipality is located at the Zealand and Amager islands and totally surrounds Frederiksberg Municipality on all sides. The strait of Øresund lies to the east. The city of Copenhagen has grown far beyond the municipal boundaries from 1901, when Frederiksberg Municipality was made an enclave within Copenhagen Municipality. Frederiksberg has the largest population density of the municipalities of Denmark.

The municipal seat of government is the Copenhagen City Hall, the headquarters of the Copenhagen City Council. The Lord Mayor of Copenhagen is Sophie Hæstorp Andersen, since 1 January 2022. The relationship between Copenhagen Municipality and the wider city of Copenhagen is one of an administrative unit within a significantly larger city, cf. the City of London or the City of Brussels.

In the Middle Ages, Copenhagen was defined as the area enclosed within the city walls. The city centre lies in the area originally defined by the old ramparts, which are still referred to as the Fortification Ring and kept as a partial green band around it. In 1856 the ramparts were pulled down allowing for growth and expansion. In 1901 the city expanded to include Amager and Valby, while Frederiksberg became an enclave within the municipality. The Finger Plan in the second half of the 20th century led to expansion outside the municipal boundary along the commuter lines of the S-train and the Lokaltog rail lines going to i.e. Helsingør (The Coast Line northbound) and Stevns Municipality (East Line (from Køge southbound) along the Øresund. The Copenhagen-Ringsted Line makes Køge one of the railway hubs of Eastern Denmark. Road and rail construction is planned to relieve traffic congestion because the narrow  isthmus between Roskilde Fjord and Køge Bugt (Køge Bay) forms a bottleneck.

Copenhagen Municipality was one of the three last Danish municipalities not belonging to a county, the others being Frederiksberg Municipality and Bornholm. On 1 January 2007, the municipality lost its county privileges and became part of the Capital Region of Denmark.

Geography

Copenhagen Municipality is a political division covering the central city (Indre By) and certain additional areas. It encloses Frederiksberg Municipality and stretches east to the waterfront. Neighboring municipalities are Gentofte, Gladsaxe and Herlev to the north, Rødovre and Hvidovre to the west, and Tårnby to the south.

The City Hall Square is the old centre of the city, from which an old shopping street leads northeast to Kongens Nytorv, which was laid out in the seventeenth century. Christiansborg Palace, which houses the Danish parliament, is located on the islet of Slotsholmen.

Districts
The municipality is divided into ten administrative, statistical and tax districts:

Official districts:

 Indre By
 Østerbro
 Nørrebro
 Vesterbro/Kongens Enghave
 Valby
 Vanløse
 Brønshøj-Husum
 Bispebjerg
 Amager Øst
 Amager Vest

Other areas:

Slotsholmen
Frederiksstaden
Islands Brygge
Holmen
Christiania (Freetown)
Carlsberg
Sluseholmen
Amagerbro
Ørestad
Nordhavnen
Bellahøj
Brønshøj
Ryparken
Vigerslev

The suffix -bro in the names Østerbro, Nørrebro, Vesterbro and Amagerbro should not be confused with the Danish word for bridge, which is also bro. The term is thought to be an abbreviation or short form of the Danish word brolagt meaning "paved", referring to the roads paved with cobblestones leading to the city's former gates.

Demography

Historic population. The two figures for 1 February 1901 are before and after the municipality annexed some nearby parishes. The apparent decline since the mid-1900s are due to the figures not including the suburban and urban areas – notably Frederiksberg – outside Copenhagen municipality. With the exception of 2005, which saw a decrease of more than 1,000 people, the population of the municipality has been increasing since 1992 after having decreased by 303,539 inhabitants (39.517%) from 1950 to 1992.

Note. The two population numbers given for 1901 are the municipality's population before annexation and following annexation of neighbouring municipalities, which in the process made Frederiksberg municipality an enclave within the municipality of Copenhagen.

Politics and government

Copenhagen Municipality is distinct from the wider Copenhagen urban area. The seat of Copenhagen's municipal council is the Copenhagen City Hall. The council is chaired by the Lord Mayor who oversees the civic duties of the fifty-five representatives of the council. The council usually meets every other week at 17:30 on a Thursday.
They discuss a range of issues including labour and employment, business growth, economics, international cooperation and IT, urban planning, housing and construction, and young, old, and disabled peoples' issues, healthcare, and traffic, with a central focus on making the city sustainable and meeting environmental and health targets.

All members of the council are elected every four years. In the municipal elections in November 2013 (see below), the Social Democrats remained in first place with 27.8% of the vote (down by 2.2% from 2009), while the Red-Green Alliance was in second place with 19.5%. In the 2021 elections, the Red-Green Alliance secured a higher vote total than the Social Democrats. This was the first time that a party other than the Social Democrats topped the ballot. The Social Democrats have claimed the office of mayor for the past 110 years.

The municipal government is divided into seven administrative departments: Employment and Integration, Culture and Leisure, Health and Care, Finance, Child and Youth, Social Services, and Technical and Environmental Administration. It has six political committees and a finance committee. The annual budget for the city is proposed in August and finalized in October and the annual report is published in May of every year. The accounting firm Deloitte is responsible for auditing the City of Copenhagen's accounts.

Lord mayors since 1938 

All lord mayors of Copenhagen have belonged to the Social Democratic party.

1938–1946: Viggo Christensen
1946–1956: Hans Peter Sørensen
1956–1962: Sigvard Munk
1962–1976: Urban Hansen
1976–1989: Egon Weidekamp
1989–2004: Jens Kramer Mikkelsen
2004–2005: Lars Engberg
2006–2009: Ritt Bjerregaard
2010–2020: Frank Jensen
2020–2021: Lars Weiss (acting)
since 2022: Sophie Hæstorp Andersen

Municipal council
Copenhagen's municipal council consists of 55 members, elected every four years. Copenhagen's municipal council is by far the largest in Denmark, being the only municipal council with more than 31 seats.

Below are the municipal councils elected since 1909.

Environmental Policy
In 2009 the Copenhagen Municipal Council decided that Copenhagen will become the world's first carbon-neutral capital by 2025. 
In 2012 the European Commission announced that Copenhagen would be the 2014 European Green Capital.

See also
 List of cities and towns in Denmark

References

External links

 Official website
 CPH International Service - Citizen service for expats and students in Copenhagen
 Eniro map with named municipalities 
 Krak searchable/printable map  

 
Municipality
Municipalities in the Capital Region of Denmark
Municipalities of Denmark